Are Næss (born 14 November 1942 in Bergen) is a Norwegian physician and politician for the Christian Democratic Party.

He was elected to the Norwegian Parliament from Hordaland in 1993, and was re-elected on one occasion.

Næss studied English and later medicine, becoming a specialist in infectious diseases 1986. He worked as a doctor, and from 1993 he was a professor at Haukeland University Hospital.

References

1942 births
Living people
Physicians from Bergen
Christian Democratic Party (Norway) politicians
Members of the Storting
21st-century Norwegian politicians
20th-century Norwegian politicians
Politicians from Bergen